Tattarang is an Australian private investment company owned by Andrew Forrest and his family. Tattarang invests in a diverse range of businesses across agri-food, energy, health technology, property, resources, and lifestyle. The group is made up of six business divisions: Fiveight, Harvest Road, Squadron Energy, Tenmile, Wyloo Metals and Z1Z.

Tattarang was previously known as Minderoo Group until May 2020 when the company was rebranded. The name is a tribute to a stallion owned by Forrest’s mother at the family’s Minderoo Station during the 1950s.

Divisions

Fiveight 
Fiveight invests in, develops and manages residential, commercial and industrial property. On 29 April 2022 it was announced that Fiveight bought the Carillon City centre for AU$80 million. Fiveight owns Cottesloe’s Indiana Teahouse, East Perth Power Station and 190 Saint Georges Terrace, all of which it plans to redevelop. In February 2023, Fiveight acquired the Waldorf Astoria Sydney, a hotel in development in Circular Quay, for around A$520 million.

Squadron Energy 
Squadron Energy is an Australian resources company focused on projects in natural resources and renewable energy.

In March 2022 Forrest, via Squadron, along with Atlassian co-founder Mike Cannon-Brookes, together invested  in the Australia-Asia Power Link project, which is backed by the Australian-Singaporean company Sun Cable. It includes the construction of a solar and battery farm  in size at Powell Creek, Northern Territory, and a power cable to link it to Singapore (via Indonesia), leaving Australia at Murrumujuk beach, NT. Transmission is planned to start in 2026.

In December 2022, Squadron acquired CWP Renewables, an Australian developer and owner of renewable energy systems, for over $4 billion.

Tenmile 
Tenmile is a venture capital firm which invests in health technology companies and solutions delivering life-changing ideas and better health outcomes. It launched in August 2022 with a $250 million fund. It is named after a pool of water on the Ashburton River.

Harvest Road 
Harvest Road concentrate on three core areas: meat, aquaculture and plant based. , Forrest owns the agribusiness Harvest Road, which deals in beef and seafood, with a focus on ethically and sustainably produced food. Harvest Road owns the brands Harvey Beef, Leeuwin Coast, and Ernest Green and Sons.

Forrest acquired meat processing company Harvey Beef in May 2014 for 40 million. The biggest exporter of beef in Western Australia, it was until August 2014 the only one accredited to export to China.

Wyloo Metals 
Wyloo Metals is Tattarang's mining division. In December 2020, Wyloo acquired a near 38 percent stake in Canadian nickel mining company Noront Resources for US$26.5 million. In December 2021, Wyloo announced it would acquire Noront after BHP dropped out of the ensuing takeover battle. The acquisition was completed in April 2022 and Noront was renamed Ring of Fire Metals in September 2022 after the region in Ontario.

In August 2022, Wyloo made a A$150 million cornerstone investment in West Australian rare earths developer Hastings Technology Metals. The investment allowed Hastings to purchase a 22 percent stake in Canadian magnet maker Neo Performance Materials.

Z1Z 
Z1Z is Tattarang's hospitality and lifestyle arm. It operates the luxury Gaia spa in Byron Bay, Cape Lodge hotel in Margaret River, and restaurants Cooee at the Old Swan Brewery and Indigo Oscar at Indiana Teahouse.

Other businesses and stakes

R. M. Williams 
Tattarang purchased footwear and clothing company RM Williams in 2020 from Hong Kong based owner L Catterton. The (originally Australian) company had been partly owned by French luxury brand conglomerate LVMH since 2013. The company was purchased for $190 million. Around 35 per cent of RM Williams' manufacturing is done offshore, and Forrest has said he will return this part of the business's manufacture to Australia.

SFM Marine 
SFM Marine is a maritime services company owned by Tattarang after it acquired Northport Marine Services in 2020 and rebranded it. In 2021, SFM Marine acquired Henderson-based company The Boat Business.

Stakes in other companies 
Tattarang holds a 19.3 percent stake in WA-based shipbuilder Austal and a 11.5 percent stake in food and drinks company Bega Group.

Ukraine Green Growth Initiative 
In 2022, Andrew Forrest stated that he will invest $740 million in businesses in Ukraine to help their economy recover.  This investment fund will focus on primary infrastructure such as energy and communications to build a digital green grid, so Ukraine can become a model for the world as a leading digital green economy.

References

External links
 
 Fiveight website
 Harvest Road website
 Squadron Energy website
 Tenmile website
 Wyloo Metals website
 Z1Z website

Private equity firms of Australia
Investment companies of Australia
Privately held companies of Australia
Holding companies of Australia